Gaston Petit (6 October 1890 – September 1984) was a French sculptor. His work was part of the sculpture event in the art competition at the 1928 Summer Olympics.

References

1890 births
1984 deaths
20th-century French sculptors
French male sculptors
Olympic competitors in art competitions